Walter Herman Sumner (born February 2, 1947) is a former American football player who was selected by the Cleveland Browns in the seventh round of the 1969 NFL Draft. A 6'1", 188 lbs. safety from Florida State University, Sumner played in 6 NFL seasons from 1969 to 1974.

At Florida State, he was a two-sport star as an outfielder and defensive back.  His 11 collegiate interceptions and two punt returns for touchdowns led to his induction into the FSU Hall of Fame in 1982.

References

External links
Pro Football Reference

1947 births
Living people
People from Ocilla, Georgia
American football safeties
Florida State Seminoles football players
Cleveland Browns players
Players of American football from Georgia (U.S. state)